Haji Ashaari Mohammad (30 October 1937 – 13 May 2010) was the leader of the Malaysian-based Islamic religious sect Al-Arqam.  The sect was banned by in Malaysia by the federal government on 21 October 1994. He and other Al-Arqam members were arrested in Thailand, returned to Malaysia and detained  under Internal Security Act (ISA). He had been detained from 1994 to 2004. He was forced to admit his wrong doings and denied the rights to defend himself.

Ashaari was nicknamed "Abuya" (father in Arabic) by his followers, and was known for wearing a turban, green Al-Arqam rope, and having kohl-lined eyes.

Biography

Early life

Marriage and children
He married five times and had four wives at most at the same time.
 Ustazah Hasnah binti Haji Salim (married 1959, divorced 1985)
 Ustazah Tengku Noriah Tengku Abdullah (married 1978)
 Ustazah Rokiah Mohd Radhi (married 1980, died 2002)
 Ustazah Khadijah Aam (married 1980) :ms:Khadijah Aam
 Ustazah Noraziah Ibrahim (married 1985)

He had 37 children.

Death and afterward
He was pronounced dead on 13 May 2010 at 02.10 local time  in  Ipoh Specialist Hospital.

Philosophical and/or political views
Two books written by Khadijah Aam, Ashaari's wife, including his biography, have been banned on religious grounds, including the claim that Ashaari Mohammad had been empowered by Allah with supernatural powers.

Books
 Inilah Jalan Kita ( 1984 )
 Ibadah Menurut Islam (1980) 
 Iman Dan Persoalannya (1983)
 Matlamat Perjuangan Menurut Islam ( 1984 )
 Mengenal Diri Melalui Rasa Hati ( 1985 )
 Aurad Muhammadiyah Pegangan Darul Arqam ( 1986 )
 Siapakah Mujaddid Kurun 15 ( 1987 )
 Krisis Dan Jalan Penyelesaiannya ( 1987 )
 Bahaya Syiah ( 1987 )
 Inilah Pandanganku ( 1988 )
 Berhati-hati Membuat Tuduhan ( 1989 )
 Kenapa Salahkan Musuh ( 1989 )
 Manisnya Madu ( 1990 )
 Inilah Sikap Kita ( 1990 )
 Renungan Untuk Mengubah Sikap ( 1990 )
 Pendidikan Rasulullah ( 1990 )
 Pembangun Jiwa dan Fikiran Ummah ( 1990 )
 Langkah-langkah Perjuangan ( 1991 )
 Manusia Tidak Memiliki Dan Tidak Dimiliki ( 1991 )
 Aqidah Mukmin Siri 2 ( 1991 )
 Aqidah Mukmin Siri 1 ( 1991 )
 Perang Teluk Islam Akan Kembali Gemilang ( 1991 )
 Konsep Kesederhanaan Menurut Pandangan Islam ( 1991 )
 Ulama Menurut Pandangan Islam ( 1992 )
 Falsafah Perlaksanaan Hukum Hudud Dalam Masyarakat ( 1992 )
 Falsafah Kemiskinan Dan Jalan Penyelesaiannya Menurut Islam ( 1993 )
 The West on The Brink of Death (1993)
 Presiden Soeharto Ikut Jadual Allah ( 1993 ) 
 Barat di Ambang Maut (1993)
 Keadilan Menurut Islam ( 1993 )
 Meninjau Sistem Pemerintahan Islam ( 1993 )
 Aqidah Mukmin Siri 3 ( 1993 )
 Kasih Sayang Kunci Perpaduan Sejagat ( 1994 )
 Jihad Bukan Membunuh Tapi Membangun Peradaban ( 2004 )
 Buah Fikiran Siri 1 (2005) 
 Buah Fikiran Siri 2 (2005) 
 Nasihat Buatmu Bekas Kawan-kawan Lamaku Dalam Arqam (2005) 
 Kumpulan Sajak Tauhid ( 2005 )
 Kumpulan Sajak Siri 2 Tasawuf ( 2005 )
 Kumpulan Sajak Perjuangan Dan Umum ( 2005 )
 Bisikan Hati : Koleksi Madah Hatiku ( 2005 )
 Tsunami Pembawa Mesej Dari Tuhan ( 2005 )
 Pendidikan Rapat Dengan Rohaniah Manusia (2006) 
 Koleksi Sajak Sembahyang Melahirkan Rasa Kehambaan Dan Membina Jati Diri (2006)
 Politik Islam Membawa Kasih Sayang (2007) 
 Islamic Politics: Politics of Love And Fraternity (2007)
 Keluarga Bahagia (2008)
 Modul Poligami Indah Dari Tuhan (2009)

Bibliography
 Seng, Ann Wan, Al Arqam di Sebalik Tabir, 2005
 Aam, Khadijah. Abuya Ashaari Muhammad : pemimpin paling ajaib di zamannya. Rawang, Selangor Darul Ehsan: Penerbitan Minda Ikhwan, 2006. 
 Aam, Khadijah, Abuya Ashaari Muhammad: The Most Miraculous Leader of His Time,2006 
 Ya'cub, A Tasman, Dakwah Islam Dalam Perpektif Ashaari Muhammad, 2006
 Nizamuddin, Mohd  bin Hj Ashaari, Abuya Hj Ashaari Muhammad Adalah Putera Bani Tamim, 2007
 Aam, Khadijah, Tsunami Membuktikan Abuya Putra Bani Tamim (Satria Piningit), 2010

See also
 Al-Arqam
 Obedient Wives Club

References

External links
 Don’t try to revive banned al-Arqam
 A Malay Plot? Or Just a Well-Meaning Commune?
 

2010 deaths
Malaysian Muslims
Malaysian religious leaders
Islamic fundamentalism
1930s births
1937 births